The Constitutional Forum,  whose domain name was  xianzheng.net, was a Mainland China-based academic thought forum dedicated to constitutional theory and China's constitutional transformation,  with constitutionalism as its core content. It was founded in 2002, and Chen Yongmiao was its webmaster. The site was banned several times by the Chinese government.

Shut down
On September 9 2003, Beijing telecommunications regulators ordered the shutdown of Constitutional Forum for posting articles about political and constitutional reforms.

References 

Defunct websites
Internet censorship
Internet properties established in 2002
2003 disestablishments